Parabuthus mossambicensis, the orange flattail scorpion, is a species of highly venomous scorpion found in southern Africa. The scorpion is reddish brown to orange and grows up to 80mm in length.

References

External links
Southern african scorpions

mossambicensis
Scorpions of Africa
Animals described in 1861
Taxa named by Wilhelm Peters